Marcus Fåglum Karlsson (born 20 July 1994) is a Swedish former cyclist, who rode professionally between 2014 and 2017 for the  and  teams. He is the son of Jan Karlsson and grandson of Sture Pettersson.

Major results

2011
 National Junior Road Championships
1st  Road race
1st  Time trial
 4th Time trial, UCI Junior Road World Championships
2012
 National Junior Road Championships
1st  Time trial
2nd Road race
 4th Overall Niedersachsen-Rundfahrt
 UEC European Junior Road Championships
5th Time trial
7th Road race
 5th Overall Trofeo Karlsberg
2013
 1st  Time trial, National Under-23 Road Championships
2014
 National Road Championships
3rd Road race
3rd Time trial
 10th Time trial, UEC European Under-23 Road Championships
2015
 2nd Road race, National Under-23 Road Championships
2016
 1st  Mountains classification Olympia's Tour
 National Under-23 Road Championships
2nd Road race
2nd Time trial
 3rd Ringerike GP
2017
 7th Overall International Tour of Rhodes

References

External links

1994 births
Living people
Swedish male cyclists
20th-century Swedish people
21st-century Swedish people